Lai Hsiu-wen (born 21 September 1976) is a Taiwanese taekwondo practitioner. She won a bronze medal in featherweight at the 1997 World Taekwondo Championships in Hong Kong, after being defeated by Jung Jae-eun in the semi final. She also competed at the 1995 World Taekwondo Championships.

References

External links

1976 births 
Living people
Taiwanese female taekwondo practitioners
World Taekwondo Championships medalists
20th-century Taiwanese women